Yapıcıoğlu  (Turkish: "son of the maker, builder") is a surname. Notable people with the surname include:

 Mennan Yapıcıoğlu (born 1966), German director, screenwriter, producer and actor
 Yavuz Yapıcıoğlu (born 1967), Turkish serial killer and arsonist 
 Zekeriya Yapıcıoğlu (born 1966), Kurdish politician and lawyer

Turkish-language surnames